Sakalakala Vallavan Appatakkar is a 2015 Tamil-language comedy film written and directed by Suraj. The film stars Jayam Ravi, Trisha and Anjali, while Prabhu and Soori appear in supporting roles and Vivek in a guest appearance. S. Thaman composed the film's music, while cinematography was by U. K. Senthil Kumar and editing by Selva RK. The film was released on 31 July 2015.

Plot
Shakthi (Jayam Ravi) and Chinnasamy (Soori) are family enemies who fight over an election. During that time, Shakthi falls in love with Anjali (Anjali), whom he later discovers is Chinnasamy's cousin. Shakthi is forced to marry Divya (Trisha) under some circumstances. Before starting a life together, Divya tells Shakthi that they must get to know each other, but every time Shakthi tries to do something good, it ends bad. Divya asks for divorce and Shakthi tells Divya to stay for a month with his parents so that they will not get hurt over the fact that they made Shakthi marry someone who does not like him. To make this worse, Shakthi's father (Prabhu) gets Divya to stand for the female election, to which she agrees. When she loses the election, Shakthi's father hits him. That is when Shakthi reveals how he lost in love and life. Seeing how much he loves and respects his family and how his life has been, Divya slowly starts to like Shakthi. At the end, Divya and Shakthi happily live together while they argue over little things, making their life filled with love.

Cast

Production
The film was launched in early June 2014 as a collaboration between director Suraj and producers Lakshmi Movie Makers with Jayam Ravi signed on to play the leading role. Actress Anjali was signed on to play a supporting role in July 2014, marking her comeback after a hiatus from Tamil films.
The team began shooting in Chennai in July 2014, before moving on to Pondicherry. Village portion completely was shot in Adavi Nainaar Dam near Mekkarai village in Tenkasi.

Trisha joined the cast in August 2014 to play the female lead, after the team opted against signing Kajal Aggarwal, who had asked for a high remuneration. Catherine Tresa was also considered but not selected for the role. Poorna does a cameo role in the film. Vivek did a role in the film for which he shaved his head. The film was initially titled Appatakkar, after a line popularised by Santhanam in Boss Engira Bhaskaran. In July 2015, the title of the film was changed to Sakalakala Vallavan after M. Saravanan, the producer of the 1982 film of the same name, gave the makers permission to re-use his film's title.

Soundtrack

S. Thaman composed the soundtrack of this film. While Sony Music originally acquired the rights of the soundtrack. Lahari Music, T-Series and Aditya Music also handled the soundtrack rights, since most of the songs, composed by S. Thaman are reused from his previous Telugu films.

Reception
The film was universally panned by critics. Avinash Gopinath of Filmbeat.com rated 3 out of 5 stars  and said  "An Outdated Flick"  Rediff rated 1 out of 5 and said "The absurd script, inept execution, bizarre antics of the lead and supporting actors coupled with some ordinary music make director Suraj’s Sakalakala Vallavan Appatakkar a total bore". Behindwoods rated 1 out of 5 and wrote that "Despite its intentions, this Sakalakalavallavan doesn't entertain". Times of India rated 0.5 out of 5 and noted that "Sakalakala Vallavan is so abominable — a blot in the career of everyone involved in making it — that it makes us question its very existence and how it even came to be made".

References

External links
 

2010s Tamil-language films
Films shot in Tamil Nadu
2015 films
Indian action comedy films
Films scored by Thaman S
2015 action comedy films